Liselotte Richter (7 June 1906, in Berlin – 16 January 1968, in Berlin) was a German philosopher and theologian. She was the first female professor of philosophy in Germany.

Liselotte Richter studied Philosophy, Theology and German at the Humboldt University of Berlin, the Philipps University of Marburg and the Albert Ludwig University of Freiburg from 1926 to 1932. There, she studied under Martin Heidegger, Edmund Husserl, and Erich Frank among others and completed her doctorate under Frank in 1932. Richter's work included a special focus in the writings of Søren Kierkegaard.

Academic activity 

During the Nazi regime, Liselotte Richter worked for the Leibniz-Edition of the Prussian Academy of Sciences and was also active as a caregiver for the German Red Cross from 1943 to 1945. After the Second World War, she became borough city councilwoman for education and culture for Charlottenburg, habilitated at the Humboldt University in Berlin, and became the first woman in Germany to be appointed to a professorship in pure philosophy in 1948.  As part of the academic restructuring of philosophy (2nd University Reform 1950/51) in the German Democratic Republic, Richter was forced out of the philosophy department in 1951 and reassigned to the department of theology under the guise of a promotion.  She received a professorship with a chair in the philosophy of religion - the first female academic in Germany to do so.  Her chair belonged to the subdivision of systematic theology in the faculty of theology.  She lectured on the history of philosophy and devoted herself to research on the philosophy of religion.

In 1965, she received an honorary doctorate from the faculty of theology for her dedicated teaching. Her work reflects a variety of interests. In addition to Søren Kierkegaard, she also wrote publications on René Descartes, Jakob Böhme, Gottfried Wilhelm Leibniz, Moses Mendelssohn, Angelus Silesius, Rainer Maria Rilke, Karl Jaspers, Albert Camus, Jean-Paul Sartre, and Mahatma Gandhi. She commuted between her place of residence in West Berlin (Charlottenburg) and her work at the Humboldt University in East Berlin, and continued teaching after the Berlin Wall was built. After a long illness, she died on 16 January 1968 and was buried at Luisenfriedhof II in Berlin-Westend. Her grave is dedicated as a grave of honour of the city of Berlin.

On 7 June 2006, the faculty of theology of the Humboldt University in Berlin commemorated Richter for her 100th birthday. Richard Schröder, Catherina Wenzel, and Michael Weichenhan wrote the memorial volume „Nach jedem Sonnenuntergange bin ich verwundet und verwaist.“ Für Liselotte Richter zum 100. Geburtstag.  From 2007 to 2013, the Leibniz-Edition Potsdam of the Berlin-Brandenburg Academy of Sciences and Humanities awarded the Liselotte Richter Prize, which was endowed with 1,000 euros, to upper secondary school students in Berlin and Brandenburg.

Selected publications

Monographies 

 Der Begriff der Subjektivität bei Kierkegaard. Ein Beitrag zur christlichen Existenzdarstellung. Triltsch, Würzburg 1934 (at the same time: Marburg Univ. Diss.)
 Immanenz und Transzendenz im nachreformatorischen Gottesbild. Vandenhoeck & Ruprecht, Göttingen 1955
 Jakob Böhme. Mystische Schau. (Geistiges Europa). Hoffmann & Campe, Hamburg 1947
 Jean-Paul Sartre. (Köpfe des XX. Jahrhunderts; 23). Colloquium-Verlag, Berlin 1964
 Leibniz und sein Rußlandbild. Akademie-Verlag, Berlin 1949
 Mahatma Gandhi. (Köpfe des XX. Jahrhunderts; 25). Colloquium-Verlag, Berlin 1962
 Philosophie der Dichtkunst. Moses Mendelssohns Ästhetik zwischen Aufklärung und Sturm und Drang. Chronos-Verlag, Berlin 1948
 René Descartes. Dialoge mit deutschen Denkern. (Geistiges Europa). Hoffmann & Campe, Hamburg 1949
 Schöpferischer Glaube im Zeitalter der Angst. Glock, Wiesbaden 1954

As an editor 

 Albert Camus: Der Mythos von Sisyphos. Ein Versuch über das Absurde. Rowohlt, Reinbek bei Hamburg 1959 [u. ö. bis 1997],  (with the essay Camus und die Philosophen in ihrer Aussage über das Absurde von Liselotte Richter, which is not included in the new translation from 1999.)
 Sören Kierkegaard: Werke. Europäische Verlagsanstalt, Hamburg (with the essay Zum Verständnis des Werks)

 Der Begriff Angst. 1996, .
 Die Wiederholung. 2005, .
 Furcht und Zittern. 1998, .
 Die Krankheit zum Tode. 1995, .
 Philosophische Brocken. 1992, .

Sources 

 Richard Schröder u. a. (Hrsg.): Nach jedem Sonnenuntergange bin ich verwundet und verwaist. Liselotte Richter zum 100. Geburtstag. Frank & Timme, Berlin 2006, .
 Karl-Wolfgang Tröger: Liselotte Richter als Forscher- und Lehrerpersönlichkeit. In: Die Zeichen der Zeit. Volume 40, Issue 11, 1986, Pages 283–287.
 Karl-Wolfgang Tröger: Zur Geschichte des Spezialfaches Allgemeine Religionsgeschichte. In: Helmut Klein (Hrsg.): Zur Geschichte der Theologischen Fakultät Berlins. Humboldt-Universität, Berlin 1975, pages 577–579 (= Wissenschaftliche Zeitschrift der Humboldt-Universität zu Berlin Volume. 34, 1985).
 Catherina Wenzel: Von der Leidenschaft des Religiösen. Leben und Werk der Liselotte Richter (1906–1968). Böhlau, Köln 1999, .

References 

1906 births
1968 deaths
20th-century German philosophers
German women philosophers
German theologians
Women theologians